The Fort Duchère or Fort Balmont is located in the 9th arrondissement of Lyon. Composed of five bastions built between 1844 and 1851, it is part of the first belt of fortifications in Lyon, which include:
Fort de Caluire (now demolished), 
Fort de Loyasse and 
Fort Saint-Jean.
This fort was unusual for its star shape, evoking the style of Vauban fortification and construction. It was demolished in 1960 and replaced by a sports complex.

History  

It was originally built to defend Lyon in case the enemy managed to infiltrate Limonest by the road from Paris, more particularly by royal roads of Burgundy and Bourbonnais.

In 1944, 39 French Resistance fighters were shot by the Vichy French at the fort after they were sentenced to death at a court-martial. Decommissioned in 1957, the fort was used in the 1960s as a recruitment center for the army, then welcomed returning soldiers home from Algerian War.

Contemporary period  
When the neighborhood of Duchère was built, Fort Balmont became a sports complex that included Duchère Stadium and the Stephane-Diagana Athletic Hall. Nothing remains of the fort there now.

See also
Ceintures de Lyon

Bibliography  
 

9th arrondissement of Lyon
Fortifications of Lyon
Fortification lines